Sedgemoor is a local government district in the English county of Somerset. In the United Kingdom, the term listed building refers to a building or other structure officially designated as being of special architectural, historical or cultural significance; Grade II* structures are those considered to be "particularly significant buildings of more than local interest". Listing was begun by a provision in the Town and Country Planning Act 1947. Once listed, severe restrictions are imposed on the modifications allowed to a building's structure or its fittings. In England, the authority for listing under the Planning (Listed Buildings and Conservation Areas) Act 1990 rests with Historic England, a non-departmental public body sponsored by the Department for Digital, Culture, Media and Sport; local authorities have a responsibility to regulate and enforce the planning regulations.

Sedgemoor is a low-lying area of land close to sea level between the Quantock and Mendip hills, historically largely marsh (or moor). It contains the bulk of the area also known as the Somerset Levels, including one of Europe's oldest known engineered roadways, the Sweet Track.

There are 90 Grade II* listed buildings in Sedgemoor. The oldest buildings in the list are Anglo-Saxon and Norman churches, with many more churches and churchyard crosses from the Middle Ages. There are also medieval country houses and the remains of castles. Urban architecture is represented by King Square in Bridgwater. Industrial buildings include Ashton Windmill which was built in the 18th century, on a site which has been the location of a windmill since the medieval period. In Bridgwater the Chandos Glass Cone and  Brick Kiln are parts of its industrial history. Related transport structures include Bridgwater railway station and the Telescopic Bridge carrying the railway over the River Parrett. The history of the drainage of the Somerset Levels is on display at the Westonzoyland Pumping Station Museum. One of the first buildings to make extensive use of Portland cement for pre-cast concrete was Castle House in Bridgwater which was built in 1851. Decorative work in Bridgwater is also represented with the inclusion of the Blake Statue and War Memorial.

Buildings

|}

See also
 Grade II* listed buildings in Somerset
 Grade I listed buildings in Sedgemoor

Notes

References

External links

 
Lists of Grade II* listed buildings in Somerset